Hepburn is a hamlet and former civil parish, now in the civil parish of Chillingham in the county of Northumberland, England. The civil parish was merged into Chillingham in 1935. In 1951 the civil parish had a population of 43.

Etymology
The standard authorities give Hepburn as in origin an Old English name deriving from heah 'high' + byrgen 'burial mound'.

See also
Bewick and Beanley Moors SSSI

References

External links 

  
Hamlets in Northumberland
Former civil parishes in Northumberland